Transit is the second studio album by the Pinoy rock band Sponge Cola, released on September 8, 2006, and their first under Universal Records. The album was certified Platinum by the Philippine Association of the Record Industry (PARI) with sales of 40,000 physical CD copies to date.

Transit spawned a carrier single, "Bitiw", which was released to radio stations on August 23. In 2008, Transit was re-released as Transit Deluxe, which features additional songs, acoustic versions of songs, a cover song by APO Hiking Society, and a radio edit version, as well as a Video CD (VCD) containing music videos.

In late 2013, Transit Deluxe was re-issued as part of Palabas & Transit Collection, a release that also includes the standard edition of Sponge Cola's debut album Palabas; this release does not include a VCD.

Background
In an interview, Yael Yuzon explained, "I think on the first record we just wanted to have an album out as a collection of songs written from high school; while on Transit, we wanted to push the limits of our song-writing so we took a creatively different approach for every song."

In popular culture
The single "Bitiw" was used as a theme song for the television series Pedro Penduko. It was also performed in the second season of Your Face Sounds Familiar, when Yael Yuzon dueted with KZ Tandingan, the latter of whom impersonated Yael.

Track listing

Transit Deluxe (VCD)

Transit Deluxe (2008)/Palabas & Transit Collection(2013)

Members
Yael Yuzon - vocals, rhythm guitar
Gosh Dilay - bass guitar, additional guitar (track 12)
Erwin Armovit - lead guitar
Chris Cantada - drums, additional guitar (track 12), backing vocals

Additional Musicians
Patrick Tirano - Additional Vocals (track 2,11), Additional Guitars (track 5,6)
Bea Garcia - Additional Vocals (track 4)
Yan Yuzon - Keyboards (track 6,9), Additional Guitars (track 6)
Yosef Garcia - Additional Vocals (track 9)

Album Credits
Executive Producer: Sponge Cola, Raymund R. Fabul, Kathleen Dy-Go
Track 2,6 & 10 Co Produced by: Yan Yuzon
Engineered & Mixed By: Patrick Tirano
Recorded at: Wombworks Studios Except "Nakapagtataka" Recorded at Sound Creation Studios by Shinji Tanaka
Mastered By: Zach Lucero
Additional Samples For "Nocturnal" Recorded at: Knives Studios
Album Design & Concept by: Ginio & Sponge Cola
CD Graphics, Artistic Direction: GOrio/Multimedia Productions
Photography: Paolo Pineda
Wardrobe: Guada Reyes
Hair & Make Up: Cathy Cantada

References

2006 albums
2008 albums
Sponge Cola albums